Phaos is a genus of moths in the family Erebidae from Australia. The genus was described by Francis Walker in 1855.

Species 
 Phaos aglaophara Turner, 1926
 Phaos interfixa Walker, 1855

References

Spilosomina
Moth genera